Perry Barr Railway Station is a railway station in Perry Barr, Birmingham, England, and is one of the oldest continuously operated railway station sites in the world, having first opened in 1837. The station has been rebuilt several times, including electrification of the line in the 1960s, and most recently in 2021-2022.

History 

The original station was built by the Grand Junction Railway in 1837, and so the station is the oldest one on its original site in the city, and one of the oldest continuously operated station sites in the world. The Grand Junction became part of the London and North Western Railway (LNWR), thence the London, Midland and Scottish Railway (LMS), and each owned the station in turn. Together with the rest of Britain's railways it was nationalised in 1948.

1960s redevelopment 

The station was rebuilt when the line was electrified in 1966 as part of the London Midland Region's electrification programme. The actual energization of the line from Coventry to Walsall through Aston took place on 15 August 1966.

2020s redevelopment 

In 2019, the West Midlands Rail Executive and Transport for West Midlands put forward proposals to redevelop Perry Barr station, along with a new bus interchange, in time for the 2022 Commonwealth Games—which is to be held in Birmingham. Proposed designs were revealed in September 2020. Further revisions were proposed in December. The designs were approved and the station was closed on 10 May 2021 for redevelopment, with the station reopened on 29 May 2022. The new building has a bronze-coloured frieze depicting athletes.

Features 

The pedestrian entrance is on the A34 Walsall Road. The station has two side platforms, one each side of the two operating lines, with no points or sidings. The ticket office is on a bridge over the tracks, which are below street level. Both platforms have step-free access, lifts replacing the former ramps. It is staffed on a part-time basis throughout the week, and has a self-service ticket and Permit to Travel machine for use when the ticket office is closed. Waiting shelters and bench seating are provided at platform level, along with customer help points. Service information is given on information displays and by automated announcements.

As well as local residents, shops and businesses, it serves:
Alexander Stadium
Perry Barr Stadium
Perry Hall Park
a number of bus services, including the Outer Circle

Services
Services are reduced to one train per hour in the evenings and on Sundays.

The line also sees occasional use for diverted passenger trains between Birmingham New Street and Wolverhampton (and destinations further north), usually when the Stour Valley Line is closed for engineering work.

Incidents 

 On 22 December 1859 one passenger jumped from a Walsall to Birmingham train and was killed, and others were injured, due to the train, using South Staffordshire Railway rolling stock, being derailed by one of its carriages shedding a tyre.
 On 22 December 1895, Mark Robins, a LNWR guard, was killed while his goods train was waiting in a siding at the station for a faster football excursion train from Liverpool to Birmingham to pass. Due to fog, he did not see the approaching train, and was struck by it.

References

External links

Rail Around Birmingham and the West Midlands: Perry Barr railway station
Warwickshire Railways page

Grand Junction Railway
DfT Category E stations
Railway stations in Birmingham, West Midlands
Former London and North Western Railway stations
Railway stations in Great Britain opened in 1837
Railway stations served by West Midlands Trains
Perry Barr